The National Security Advisory Council was an body of external experts which provided advice to the Cabinet of Canada on matters of national security.

History
The NSAC was created by the Martin government as part of the output of the 2004 policy document entitled Securing an Open Society: Canada's National Security Policy.

It was cancelled by the Harper government in October 2012.

References

Government of Canada